Alcyone , designated η Tauri (Eta Tauri, abbreviated Eta Tau, η Tau), is a star in the constellation of Taurus. Approximately 440 light-years from the Sun, it is the brightest star in the Pleiades open cluster, which is a young cluster, around 100 million years old. There are a number of fainter stars very close to Alcyone, some of which are members of the same cluster.

Nomenclature
Eta Tauri is the star's Bayer designation. The name Alcyone originates in Greek mythology; she is one of the seven daughters of Atlas and Pleione known as the Pleiades. In 2016, the International Astronomical Union (IAU) organized a Working Group on Star Names (WGSN) to catalog and standardize proper names for stars. The WGSN's first bulletin of July 2016 included a table of the first two batches of names approved by the WGSN; which included Alcyone for this star. It is now so entered in the IAU Catalog of Star Names.

Physical Properties 
Alcyone Is a blue-white B-type giant, similar the other bright B-type stars in the Pleiades cluster. With an apparent magnitude of +2.87 (absolute magnitude = −2.39), it is the brightest and most luminous star in the Pleiades.  The spectral type of B7IIIe indicates that emission lines are present in its spectrum. Like many Be stars, Alcyone has created a gaseous disk flung into orbit around the star from its equator.

Alcyone has a high rotational velocity, which causes it to have an ellipsoidal shape. Its effective radius is almost ten times that of the Sun, but the actual radius is lesser at poles and greater at the equator. Its effective temperature is approximately 12,300 K, with the actual temperature being greater at the poles and lesser at the equator. Its bolometric luminosity is 2,030 times solar.

Companions

The Catalog of Components of Double and Multiple Stars lists three companions: B is 24 Tauri, a magnitude 6.28 A0 main-sequence star 117" away; C is V647 Tauri, a δ Sct variable star; and D is a magnitude 9.15 F3 main-sequence star. V647 Tau varies from magnitude +8.25 to +8.30 over 1.13 hours.

The Washington Double Star Catalog lists a further four companions, all fainter than 11th magnitude, and also describes component D as itself double with two nearly equal components separated by 0.30".

Some previous lunar occultation studies found evidence of sub-arcsound companions, but more recently, a 2021 interferometric study concluded that Alcyone is a single star system.

See also
 Circumstellar disc
 List of stars in Taurus
 Lists of stars
 Shell star
 White Tiger

References

External links

 Jim Kaler's Stars, University of Illinois:ALCYONE (Eta Tauri)
 Alcyone and the Pleiades

Tauri, Eta
Taurus (constellation)
B-type giants
A-type main-sequence stars
F-type main-sequence stars
Eclipsing binaries
5
Delta Scuti variables
Pleiades Open Cluster
Alcyone
Alcyone
Tauri, 025
017702
1165
023630
BD+23 0541